The 2005 Northwestern Wildcats football team represented Northwestern University during the 2005 NCAA Division I-A football season. They played their home games at Ryan Field and participated as members of the Big Ten Conference. They were coached by Randy Walker. This was Randy's last season as the Wildcats' coach, as he would die from a heart attack following the season. The Wildcats finished tied for 3rd place in the Big Ten with a conference record of 5–3.

Schedule

Roster

Game summaries

Ohio

Northern Illinois

Arizona State

Penn State

Wisconsin

    
    
    
    
    
    
    
    
    
    
    
    
    
    
    
    

Brett Basanez 26/36, 361 Yds
Tyrell Sutton 29 Rush, 244 Yds

UCLA (Sun Bowl)

The Wildcats were invited to play in the 2005 Sun Bowl. They lost 38–50 to the UCLA Bruins, who staged a 22-point comeback, a record for the Bruins at the time.

References

Northwestern
Northwestern Wildcats football seasons
Northwestern Wildcats football